Luso is a civil parish of the municipality of Mealhada, Aveiro district, Portugal. The population in 2011 was 2,593, in an area of 16.87 km2. It is renowned for its mineral waters. Águas do Luso, one of the largest Portuguese companies providing mineral water is based there.

References

Spa towns in Portugal
Freguesias of Mealhada